Charlotte Barrows Chorpenning (1873 – January 7, 1955) was a children's playwright. When she was 60 years old, after her husband died, she began writing plays for children.  She was also the artistic director of the children's theatre at the Goodman Theater in Chicago, and remains the most produced playwright in Goodman history.  She adapted many famous fairy and folktales.  She believed that children would come to see plays about characters they knew already.  She also strongly believed that plays should not talk down to children, and that children should be able to identify with the lead.  Chorpenning described her writing and directing process in her book, Twenty-One Years With Children's Theatre, published in 1954.

Biography
Chorpenning studied at Radcliffe College.  From about 1915-1919 she was a playwright in residence in Winona, Minnesota organizations. Her daughter Ruth Chorpenning was a character actress on Broadway.

Chorpenning wrote adaptations of many stories and many of these plays remain in print.  One play in particular is out of print: an adaptation of Helen Bannerman's Little Black Sambo and, according to Jodi Van Der Horn-Gibson, aside from some unflattering stereotypical names and the same confusion Bannerman had with regard to the difference between India and Africa, the play is a non-offensive version of the story.  

Chorpenning died on January 7, 1955, at her home in Warwick, New York.  The obituary published in the Educational Theatre Journal stated "The American theatre is indebted to her for her skill as a playwright, her ability as a teacher, her strength as a leader, and her humanity as a friend."

The American Alliance for Theatre and Education awards the Charlotte B. Chorpenning Award for the body of work of a children's playwright.  Award recipients include Doug Cooney (2010), Barry Kornhauser (2009), James DeVita (2007), and Aurand Harris (1985 and 1967).

Plays

Published by Anchorage Press Plays
Cinderella
The Elves and the Shoemaker
Flibbertygibbet
The Indian Captive
Jack and the Beanstalk
Little Red Riding Hood
Robinson Crusoe
Rumplestiltzkin
The Sleeping Beauty

Published by Classic Youth Plays
A Letter to Santa Claus
Lincoln's Secret Messenger

Published by Dramatic Publishing
The Adventures of Tom Sawyer
Alice in Wonderland
Hansel and Gretel
The Magic Horn
Many Moons, based on the illustrated book of the same name written by James Thurber 
Rip Van Winkle

Published by Samuel French, Inc.
The Emperor's New Clothes
Tom Sawyer's Treasure Hunt

Out of print
Little Black Sambo

References

1873 births
1955 deaths
American women dramatists and playwrights
20th-century American dramatists and playwrights
20th-century American women writers
Radcliffe College alumni